Judith Levine (born 1952) is an American author, journalist, civil libertarian and co-founder of the National Writers Union, a trade union of contract and freelance writers, and No More Nice Girls, a group dedicated to promoting abortion rights through street theater. She is a board member of the National Center for Reason and Justice and the Vermont chapter of the ACLU.

Levine has written on sex, gender, aging, consumerism, and culture for dozens of national magazines and newspapers, including Harper's, The New York Times, Vogue, AARP The Magazine, and salon.com. Her column "Poli Psy"  in the Vermont weekly Seven Days was named Best Political Column in 2006 by the Association of Alternative Newsweeklies.  She also has written columns for New York Woman and oxygen.com.

Levine is best known for her 2002 book Harmful to Minors: The Perils of Protecting Children From Sex, in which she suggests liberalization of age-of-consent laws in the United States and the conception of minors as sexual beings, which Levine argues is extant in Western Europe.  Levine argues for weakening most United States laws governing possession of child pornography, the access of abortions to minors, and conduct classified as statutory rape.  Conservative commentators have heavily criticized her work; its publication by the University of Minnesota Press caused controversy in the Minnesota state legislature. The book was also widely praised by advocates of liberalization and educators. It won the 2002 Los Angeles Times Book Prize and was named by SIECUS, the Sexuality Information and Education Council of the United States, as one of history's most influential books about sexuality.

Levine is also the author of My Enemy, My Love: Women, Men, and the Dilemmas of Gender (originally published as My Enemy, My Love: Man-Hating and Ambivalence in Women’s Lives, 2009), in which she analyzes traditional gender roles and the relationship between misogyny and feminism; Do You Remember Me?: A Father, A Daughter, and a Search for the Self, a memoir of her father's affliction with Alzheimer's disease and a critique of the medicalization of aging; and Not Buying It: My Year Without Shopping, a witty journal in which she examines consumerism and anti-consumerist movements.  Not Buying It has been translated into five languages.

References

External links

 JudithLevine.com, Official site
 Radio interviews by Doug Henwood (links to MP3 and streaming audio files):
 On Not Buying It, March 23, 2006.
 On Do You Remember Me?, July 22, 2004.
 On Harmful to Minors, May 30, 2002.

1952 births
Living people
American political writers
American abortion-rights activists
Jewish American writers
21st-century American Jews